Alfred Thomas Swift (5 August 1871 – 8 May 1953) was an Australian rules footballer who played for the Essendon Football Club in the Victorian Football League (VFL).

In 1912 he was found guilty of the manslaughter of his wife and sentenced to eight years in jail.

Notes

External links 
		

1871 births
1953 deaths
Australian rules footballers from South Australia
Essendon Football Club players
South Adelaide Football Club players